Clarmin is an unincorporated community in Lively Grove Township, Washington County, Illinois, United States.

References

Unincorporated communities in Washington County, Illinois
Unincorporated communities in Illinois